Berenty Reserve is a small private reserve of gallery forest along the Mandrare River, set in the semi-arid spiny forest ecoregion of the far south of Madagascar. For more than three decades the late primatologist Alison Jolly (who started the research at Berenty), other researchers and students have visited Berenty to conduct fieldwork on lemurs. The reserve is also a favourite for visitors who want to see some of Madagascar's endemic bird species, which include owls and couas.

The reserve has accommodation in the forest and a set of forest trails to explore. It attracts the most visitors of any Madagascar nature reserve. It is reached after a two-hour drive from Tôlagnaro on the southeast coast.

See also
 List of national parks of Madagascar
 Madagascar spiny thickets ecoregion

References

Birds of the Indian Ocean Islands, Sinclair and Langrand, 1998.

External links

 Berenty Reserve

Protected areas of Madagascar
Nature conservation in Madagascar
Anosy